is a Japanese voice actress who works for Aoni Production. She is best known for her voice roles as Shizuru Fujino (Mai-hime) (as well as her alternate universe counterpart, Shizuru Viola in Mai-Otome), Jane Diethel in Shaman King, Risai in  12 Kingdoms, Elias "Ace" Hono in Shitsugeki! Machine Robo Rescue and Cagalli Yula Athha (Gundam Seed/Gundam Seed Destiny). She was born in Kyoto Prefecture, and her nickname is "Cindy" (シンディー).

Notable voice roles

Television animation

Anime film

Original net animation

Games 

Another Century's Episode 2 (Marina Carson)
Another Century's Episode 3 (Marina Carson)
Battlefield Valkyria: Gallian Chronicles (Irene Ellet)
God Eater 3 (Player (Female))
Hokuto Musou (Mamiya)
Kid Icarus: Uprising (Medusa)
Mobile Suit Gundam: Extreme Vs. Full Boost and Maxi Boost (Cagalli Yula Athha)
Mobile Suit Gundam SEED: Rengou vs ZAFT (Cagalli)
Mobile Suit Gundam SEED Destiny: Rengou vs ZAFT II (Cagalli)
Mobile Suit Gundam SEED Battle Destiny (Cagalli)
Samurai Warriors (Ranmaru Mori)
Samurai Warriors 2 (Ranmaru Mori, Tachibana Ginchiyo)
Samurai Warriors: Spirit of Sanada (Ranmaru Mori, Ginchiyo Tachibana)
SD Gundam G Generation Cross Rays (Cagalli)
Shin Megami Tensei: Digital Devil Saga 2 (Fred)
Spartan: Total Warrior (Electra)
Super Robot Wars Alpha 3 (Cagalli Yula Athha, Tori)
Tales of Zestiria (Forton, Atakk)
Tokimeki Memorial Girl's Side: 2nd Kiss (Tatsuko Todou)
Valkyria Chronicles (Irene Ellet)
Warriors Orochi 3 (Ranmaru Mori, Ginchiyo Tachibana)
Warriors Orochi 4 (Ranmaru Mori, Ginchiyo Tachibana)
Xenoblade Chronicles 2 (Tsuki)
Xenosaga Episode I: Der Wille zur Macht (Dr. Juli Mizrahi)
Xenosaga Episode II: Jenseits von Gut und Böse (Dr. Juli Mizrahi)
Xenosaga Episode III: Also Sprach Zarathustra (Dr. Juli Mizrahi)

Dubbing Roles 
Superman & Lois - Lana Lang-Cushing (Emmanuelle Chriqui)
Thomas the Tank Engine and Friends - Jack the Front Loader (Season 6 only)

Drama CDs 
Fruits Basket: Audio Manga DVD: Day of Departure, Again (Mayuko Shiraki)
Hayate X Blade (Maki Kamijou)
Mai-HiME drama CDs (Shizuru Fujino)
Mai-Otome drama CDs (Shizuru Viola)
Queen's Blade drama CD 3 (Analista)

Radio Personality
Okki - Shindi no Bakukarinaito! (April 2007 - March 2008)
Shindō Naomi no Hanageki Rajiwo (January - July 2012)
Shindō Naomi to Takemoto Eiji no Hanageki Rajiwo (August - September 2012) - with Eiji Takemoto

Radio Drama 
2006
Goshūshō-sama Ninomiya-kun - Ryouko Ninomiya

Web Drama 
2011
Hanageki - Chiaki Kagura

Character Image songs

Character Singles

References

External links
 
Naomi Shindou at Aoni Production
 Seiyuu info profile

Japanese video game actresses
Japanese voice actresses
1972 births
Voice actresses from Kyoto Prefecture
Living people
Aoni Production voice actors
20th-century Japanese actresses
21st-century Japanese actresses